Enpiprazole (INN, BAN) is an anxiolytic drug of the phenylpiperazine group that was never marketed. It produces anxiolytic-like effects in animals, though these effects appear to be biphasic and may reverse at high doses. It is known to produce ortho-chlorophenylpiperazine (oCPP) as a metabolite.

See also
 Acaprazine
 Enciprazine
 Lorpiprazole
 Mepiprazole
 Tolpiprazole

References

Anxiolytics
Chloroarenes
Phenylpiperazines
Pyrazoles